Gymnosoma nudifrons is a species of fly in the family Tachinidae.

Distribution
This Palaearctic species is present in most of Europe, Kazakhstan,  Transcaucasia, Russia (to Far East) and China.

Habitat
These flies mainly inhabit hedge rows, wet meadows and roadsides.

Description

These parasitic flies have a black thorax and a spherical yellowish-red abdomen with reduced bristles and black markings, often  large and triangle-shaped, sometimes touching. On the inner side of the eyes there are black stripes. The males of this species have yellowish dusting on the first part of the thorax. This species is very similar to Gymnosoma rotundatum.

Biology
Adults can be found from May to September. They feed on nectar and pollen of various flowers, especially of Angelica sylvestris, Tripleurospermum inodorum and Anthriscus species. Larvae feed on Pentatomidae.

References

External links
 Evasion
 Les insectes

Phasiinae
Diptera of Europe
Diptera of Asia
Insects described in 1966